Muhammad Rafli Asrul (born 19 February 2003) is an Indonesian professional footballer who plays as a attacking midfielder for Liga 1 club PSM Makassar and the Indonesia national under-20 team.

Club career

PSM Makassar
He was recruited by PSM Makassar U16 in early January 2018. At that time, he was 15 years old. A year later, Asrul was promoted to the PSM Makassar U18 team. Together with his squad, his performances continued to be honed and began to get the attention of many coaches. His potential continues to grow after successfully passing the second volume of the Garuda Select program selection in 2019. He received guidance from Des Walker and Dennis Wise. When participating in the second volume of the Garuda Select program, Asrul was recorded as the player who played the highest number of matches and playing minutes. His performances during that time made Asrul one of the three players who returned to training with the third edition of the Garuda Select program. Asrul made his professional debut on 8 January 2022 in a match against Madura United at the Ngurah Rai Stadium, Denpasar.

International career
On 30 May 2022, Asrul made his debut for an Indonesian youth team against a Venezuela U-20 squad in the 2022 Maurice Revello Tournament in France.

Career statistics

Club

Notes

Honours

Individual
 Liga 1 U-16 Top Goalscorer: 2019 (14 goals)

References

External links
 Rafli Asrul at Soccerway
 Rafli Asrul at Liga Indonesia

2003 births
Living people
Indonesian footballers
PSM Makassar players
Liga 1 (Indonesia) players
Indonesia youth international footballers
Association football midfielders
Sportspeople from South Sulawesi